Cathorops arenatus, the yellow sea catfish, is a species of sea catfish. It is found in the western Atlantic from the Gulf of Paria in Venezuela to Maranhão in Brazil. Maximum recorded body length is 25 cm.

References

Ariidae
Fish described in 1840
Taxa named by Achille Valenciennes